The Twenty-third Amendment to the Constitution of Pakistan, officially known as the Constitution (Twenty-third Amendment) Act, 2017, grants legal cover to military courts. The amendment was assented to by President Mamnoon Hussain in March 2017.

References

Amendments to the Constitution of Pakistan
2017 in Pakistani law
Acts of the Parliament of Pakistan